Bükkmogyorósd is a village in Borsod-Abaúj-Zemplén county, Hungary. Has road connection with Csernely and Szilvásvárad villages. Located at the west side of Bükk Mountains.

External links 
 Street map 

Populated places in Borsod-Abaúj-Zemplén County